Marc-Éric Gueï (born 28 July 1980) is a Ivorian former professional footballer who played as a striker. He mostly played for French and Greek clubs.

Career
In July 2007, Gueï began a two-week trial with Scottish side Dundee United.

Honours
Montpellier
UEFA Intertoto Cup: 1999

Châteauroux
Coupe de France runner-up: 2003–04

References

External links

1980 births
Living people
People from Montagnes District
Association football forwards
Ivorian footballers
Montpellier HSC players
ASOA Valence players
AS Beauvais Oise players
LB Châteauroux players
CS Sedan Ardennes players
FC Gueugnon players
SC Toulon players
Dubai CSC players
K.V. Oostende players
Ethnikos Asteras F.C. players
Panetolikos F.C. players
Panserraikos F.C. players
Ligue 1 players
Ligue 2 players
Championnat National players
Championnat National 2 players
Challenger Pro League players
Football League (Greece) players
Ivorian expatriate footballers
Ivorian expatriate sportspeople in France
Expatriate footballers in France
Ivorian expatriate sportspeople in the United Arab Emirates
Expatriate footballers in the United Arab Emirates
Ivorian expatriate sportspeople in Belgium
Expatriate footballers in Belgium
Ivorian expatriate sportspeople in Greece
Expatriate footballers in Greece
Expatriate footballers in Réunion
UAE Pro League players
Ivory Coast international footballers